Richard Sachs (born February 14, 1953) is an American bicycle framebuilder based in Chester, Connecticut since 1975.  He builds road racing and cyclo-cross bicycles. His lug and fitting designs are employed by many other framebuilders. Richard Sachs designs and distributes racing cycle attire, accessories and accoutrements.

Sachs has been sponsor of a New England-based cyclocross team for more than decade. It has produced nine national champions, notably Jonathan Page, a professional cyclocross racer in Belgium.

Richard Sachs Cycles

On graduating from the Peddie School in 1971, Sachs spent close to a year in England as an apprentice with Witcomb Cycles. He returned to the United States and in 1975 began building frames under his own name.  He spent over 30 years building lugged steel bicycle frames and forks in Chester, Connecticut.  He builds 80-90 a year.

He has since moved to Warwick, Massachusetts to continue his craft.

References

External links
 Richard Sachs Cycles (official site)

Cycle manufacturers of the United States
1953 births
Living people
Cyclo-cross cyclists
Bicycle framebuilders
Peddie School alumni
People from Chester, Connecticut